Troy Brownfield is a comic book writer, journalist, and college professor from Indiana.  He has an extensive list of credits, but became widely known to the online community as a columnist for Newsarama and the creator/editor of ShotgunReviews.com. In June of 2018, he joined The Saturday Evening Post as a Staff Writer. With the September/October 2022 issues of the Post, Jack & Jill (magazine), and Humpty Dumpty (magazine), he has been named Executive Editor.

Journalism background
Brownfield attended Indiana State University, where he eventually earned a master's degree in English with a focus in Creative Writing.  While an undergraduate student, Brownfield wrote a number of items for ISU's Indiana Statesman, including a catch-all column called "My Opinion, Not Yours".  This background led to Brownfield's invitation to join the now-defunct ComicKingdom.com; while working with that site, Brownfield created his "Shotgun Reviews" column, so-named because it covered a wide area of ideas and approaches with the overriding element of satirical humor.

In 1999, Brownfield created ShotgunReviews.com, a site intended to give young writers a place to sharpen their work.  The site covers several facets of entertainment, and has featured a variety of long-running columns.  Among the featured contributors have been Shawn Delaney (site webmaster and Music Editor), Jonathan Birdsong (Lyrical Lounge section editor), Russell Ray (wrestling columnist and one-time Managing Editor), L.I. Rapkin (Senior Writer), The Rev. OJ Flow (comic columnist), Corey Henson (wrestling columnist), Eric Barker (film critic), Matt McConnell (anime critic), Ian King (feature writer), Steve Ekstrom and many more (including numerous members of Birdsong's hip-hop review crew). Brownfield closed the final version of the site in 2012 after a thirteen-year run to focus on his comics writing.

Around 1999, Brownfield, who worked a day job in publishing, began aggressively pursuing print work.  His articles have appeared in sources like Wired, The Indianapolis Star, Indianapolis Monthly, INTake Weekly, Street Miami magazine, Savant online, Comicon.com's The Pulse, Nuvo Newsweekly magazine, and more.  He has also written nearly 100 features and reviews for Newtype USA magazine alone.

Brownfield eventually began contributing regularly to Newsarama.  He formerly edited and co-wrote the Best Shots review feature, as well as the columns "Your Manga Minute" and "Super-Articulate".  He remained a frequent columnist through 2011.  In 2004, Brownfield accepted an appointment to the position of Assistant Professor in the Department of English, Journalism, and Languages at Saint Mary-of-the-Woods College, where he taught journalism, English, communications and film. He left the college at the close of the 2010–2011 school year. He taught in central Indiana until 2018, when he joined the writing staff of the Indianapolis-based Saturday Evening Post. Brownfield was named Senior Editor of the Post and the Post Society's U.S. Kids Magazines (Jack & Jill and Humpty Dumpty) in 2021; he became Executive Editor in 2022. He also writes the Super-Articulate column for Graphic Policy.

Comics and more

In July 2006, Brownfield was announced as one of the first writing talents on board with the freshly minted Fangoria Comics, an offshoot imprint of the popular horror magazine. He was announced as an associate editor for the line.  He stayed with the line when they departed to become The Scream Factory, and again through their relationship with Fangoria Graphix. As of 2010, The Scream Factory again operates on its own, with Brownfield still associate editor. It was announced in February 2010 that Brownfield would be writing "Tales from Wonderland: The White Knight" for Zenescope. In November 2010, Brownfield and former Newsarama editor Matt Brady were announced as the writers of Dynamite's Buck Rogers Annual #1, due in February 2011.  Brownfield and Brady co-wrote a story for the Batman 80 Page Giant 2011, released in August.  In November, Brownfield announced that he and artist Sarah Vaughn would launch a webcomic, Sparkshooter, in February 2012; Enkaru (Encar Robles) drew #3-13, Kate Frizzell drew #14-15, and Malik O. Smith drew #16. Brownfield was announced as the new regular writer for "Grimm Fairy Tales Myths & Legends" by Zenescope Entertainment Executive Editor Raven Gregory in early summer 2012; Brownfield's first issue, #18, appeared in July. In February 2014, Brownfield was announced as the writer for a new ongoing series from Dynamite Entertainment, The Blood Queen, beginning in June. In May 2014, Dynamite Entertainment published an eBook by Brownfield, a novel titled Prince Dracula; the paperback version became available in July 2014. He was the editor-in-chief of Imminent Press. Brownfield published a horror short story collection, INHABITED, in 2019. Since 2017, Brownfield has written comics with Brazilian publishers and studios associated with frequent collaborator Paulo Teles Yonami, including House 137 and AllGeek. As Yonami's studios work closely with American publisher TidalWave, Brownfield has also been writing material in collaboration with that publisher and Yonami since 2022.

In addition to his journalism work, Brownfield has a strong reputation for providing live music events.  Beginning when he was 19, Brownfield became the first student to independently organize a music festival on the campus of Indiana State.  Some six festivals and 30+ smaller shows later, he decided to give that side of the business a rest.

Brownfield continued to work with and manage bands like Samsell.  After moving to Indianapolis in the late '90s, he organized several shows for promotional packages and charity work.  The ShotgunReviews.com site sponsored many of these endeavors.  After the dissolution of Samsell, Brownfield has retired from promotion for the time being.

Comics

Blue Moon Comics

Shotgun Press (at ShotgunReviews.com)

Fangoria Comics

Zenescope Entertainment

Dynamite Entertainment

DC Comics

Sparkshooter

House 137

Imminent Press

TidalWave Comics

Novels and collections
Prince Dracula (2014, Dynamite Entertainment; co-credit given to Bram Stoker)
Inhabited (2019)

References

External links
Newsarama
Scene Setters interview with Troy Brownfield
Super Hero Speak interview with Troy Brownfield
Troy Brownfield Returns to Super Hero Speak
Inhabited on Amazon

American male journalists
Comic book editors
Comics critics
The Indianapolis Star people
Living people
1973 births
Indiana State University alumni